Peter James Winterbottom   (born 31 May 1960 in Otley, West Yorkshire), is a former England rugby union footballer who played as an openside flanker. He was England's most-capped openside (with 58 caps) until being overtaken by Neil Back in 2003. He made his England debut on 2 January 1982 against Australia, and his final appearance on 20 March 1993 against Ireland.

Winterbottom was known for his work rate, durability, hard tackling and courage. He was selected on two British and Irish Lions tours in 1983 and 1993, both to New Zealand, where he impressed the locals with his fine play, albeit on losing sides. He was the second England player to reach 50 caps, after Rory Underwood, and was inducted onto the Twickenham "Wall of Fame" in November 2005.

Winterbottom played club rugby for Headingley, Harlequins and also for Hawkes Bay in New Zealand and Transvaal in South Africa

After rugby
Since his playing career ended, Winterbottom carved out a career in finance. He worked as a Corporate bond broker for Tullett & Tokyo Ltd and BGC Partners alongside Ben Clarke, but left BGC in 2008 to join interdealer broker Creditex.
Peter is currently Director Rugby at Esher Rugby Football Club.

Personal life
Winterbottom is the uncle of Swiss-born James Leuzinger, who represented Great Britain at the 2006 Winter Olympics.

References

External links
 Sporting heroes 1 2 3 4
 Lions profile

1960 births
Living people
English rugby union players
British & Irish Lions rugby union players from England
England international rugby union players
Leeds Tykes players
Members of the Order of the British Empire
People educated at Rossall School
Rugby union flankers
Yorkshire County RFU players
People from Otley
Rugby union players from Leeds
Harlequin F.C. players